Revealed – Live in Dallas is a music album by Myron Butler & Levi, released on March 30, 2010.

Track listing

Recording information
Personnel
Chris McQueen, Mark Lettieri (guitar)
Omar Edwards (organ, keyboards)
Jamar Jones, Shaun Martin (keyboards)
Robert Searight Jr. (drums)
Nathan Werth (percussion)

External links
Revealed: Live in Dallas

2010 live albums
Myron Butler & Levi albums